Azadegan Expressway or Tehran Ringway is an expressway in southern Tehran. It connects Tehran-Mashhad Highway to Tehran-Karaj-Tabriz Freeway and Tehran-Shomal Freeway.

Expressways in Tehran
Expressways in Iran